The following is a list of gods, goddesses, and many other divine and semi-divine figures from ancient Greek mythology and ancient Greek religion.

Immortals
The Greeks created images of their deities for many purposes. A temple would house the statue of a god or goddess, or multiple deities, and might be decorated with relief scenes depicting myths. Divine images were common on coins. Drinking cups and other vessels were painted with scenes from Greek myths.

Major gods and goddesses

Greek primordial deities

Titans and Titanesses
The Titan gods and goddesses are depicted in Greek art less commonly than the Olympians.

Gigantes

The Gigantes were the offspring of Gaia (Earth), born from the blood that fell when Uranus (Sky) was castrated by their Titan son Cronus, who fought the Gigantomachy, their war with the Olympian gods for supremacy of the cosmos, they include:
Alcyoneus (Ἀλκυονεύς), a giant usually considered to be one of the Gigantes, slain by Heracles.
Chthonius (Χθόνιος).
Damysus (Δάμυσος), the fastest of all the Giants in Greek mythology.
Enceladus (Ἐγκέλαδος), typically slain by Athena, said to be buried under Mount Etna in Sicily.
Mimas (Μίμας), according to Apollodorus, he was killed by Hephaestus, or by others Zeus or Ares.
Pallas (Πάλλας), according to Apollodorus, he was flayed by Athena, who used his skin as a shield.
Picolous (Πικόλοος), who fled the battle but was slain by Helios.
Polybotes (Πολυβώτης), typically slain by Poseidon.
Porphyrion (Πορφυρίων), one of the leaders of the Gigantes, typically slain by Zeus.
Thoas/Thoon (Θόων), he was killed by the Moirai.

Other "giants"
Aloadae (Ἀλῳάδαι), twin giants who attempted to climb to Olympus by piling mountains on top of each other.
Otus or Otos (Ότος).
Ephialtes (Εφιάλτης).
Anax (Αναξ) was a giant of the island of Lade near Miletos in Lydia, Anatolia.
Antaeus (Ἀνταῖος), a Libyan giant who wrestled all visitors to the death until he was slain by Heracles.
Antiphates (Ἀντιφάτης), the king of the man-eating giants known as Laestrygones which were encountered by Odysseus on his travels.
Argus Panoptes (Ἄργος Πανόπτης), a hundred-eyed giant tasked with guarding Io.
Asterius (Αστεριος), a Lydian giant. 
Cacus (Κακος), a fire-breathing Latin giant slain by Heracles.
Cyclopes (Hesiodic), three one-eyed giants who forged the lightning bolts of Zeus, Trident of Poseidon, and Helmet of Hades.
Arges (Ἄργης).
Brontes (Βρόντης).
Steropes (Στερόπης).
Cyclopes (Homeric), a tribe of one-eyed, man-eating giants who herded flocks of sheep on the island of Sicily.
Polyphemus (Πολύφημος), a Cyclops who briefly captured Odysseus and his men, only to be overcome and blinded by the hero.
The Gegenees (Γηγενέες), a tribe of six-armed giants fought by the Argonauts on Bear Mountain in Mysia.
Geryon (Γηρυων), a three-bodied giant who dwelt on the sunset isle at the ends of the earth. He was slain by Heracles when the hero arrived to fetch the giant's cattle as one of his twelve labours.
The Hekatoncheires (Ἑκατόγχειρες), or Centimanes (Latin), the Hundred-Handed Ones, giant gods of violent storms and hurricanes. Three sons of Uranus and Gaia, each with his own distinct characters.
Briareus (Βριάρεως) or Aigaion (Αἰγαίων), The Vigorous.
Cottus (Κόττος), The Furious.
Gyges (Γύγης), The Big-Limbed.
The Laestrygonians (Λαιστρυγόνες), a tribe of man-eating giants encountered by Odysseus on his travels.
Orion (Ὠρίων), a giant huntsman whom Zeus placed among the stars as the constellation of Orion.
Talos (Τάλως), a giant forged from bronze by Hephaestus, and given by Zeus to his lover Europa as her personal protector.
Tityos (Τίτυος), a giant slain by Apollo and Artemis when he attempted to violate their mother Leto.
Typhon (Τυφῶν), a monstrous immortal storm-giant who attempted to launch an attack on Mount Olympus but was defeated by the Olympians and imprisoned in the pits of Tartarus.

Personified concepts

Chthonic deities

Sea deities

Sky deities

Aeolus (Aiolos) (Αίολος), god of the winds
Aether (Αιθήρ), primeval god of the upper air
Alectrona (Αλεκτρονα), solar goddess of the morning or waking up
Anemoi, (Άνεμοι), gods of the winds
Aparctias (Απαρκτίας), another name for the north wind (not identified with Boreas)
Apheliotes (Αφηλιώτης), god of the east wind (when Eurus is considered southeast)
Argestes (Αργέστης), another name for the west or northwest wind
Boreas (Βορέας), god of the north wind and of winter
Caicias (Καικίας), god of the northeast wind
Circios (Κίρκιος) or Thraskias (Θρασκίας), god of the north-northwest wind
Euronotus (Ευρονότος), god of the southeast wind
Eurus (Εύρος), god of the unlucky east or southeast wind
Lips (Λίψ), god of the southwest wind
Notus (Νότος) god of the south wind
Skeiron (Σκείρων), god of the northwest wind
Zephyrus (Ζέφυρος), god of the west wind
Arke (Άρκη), messenger of the Titans and sister of Iris
Astraios (Ἀστραῖος), god of stars and planets, and the art of astrology
The Astra Planeti (Αστρα Πλανετοι), gods of the five wandering stars or planets
Stilbon (Στιλβών), god of Hermaon, the planet Mercury
Eosphorus (Ηωσφόρος), god of Venus the morning star
Hesperus (Ἓσπερος), god of Venus the evening star
Pyroeis (Πυρόεις), god of Areios, the planet Mars
Phaethon (Φαέθων), god of Dios, the planet Jupiter
Phaenon (Φαίνων), god of Kronion, the planet Saturn
Astrape and Bronte, goddesses of lightning and thunder respectively
Aurai (Αὖραι), nymphs of the cooling breeze
Aura (Αὖρα), goddess of the breeze and the fresh, cool air of early morning
Chione (Χιόνη), goddess of snow and daughter of Boreas
Eos (Ἠώς), goddess of the Dawn
Ersa (Ἕρση), goddess of the morning dew
Helios (Ἥλιος), god of the Sun and guardian of oaths
Hemera (Ημέρα), primeval goddess of the day
Hera (Ήρα), queen of the gods
The Hesperides, (´Εσπερίδες), nymphs of the evening and sunset
Iris (Ίρις), goddess of the rainbow and divine messenger
Men (Μήν), a lunar deity worshiped in the western interior parts of Anatolia
Nephele (Νεφέλη), cloud nymph
Nyx, (Νύξ), goddess of night
Pandia (Πανδία), daughter of Selene and Zeus
The Pleiades (Πλειάδες), goddesses of the star cluster Pleiades and were associated with rain
Alcyone (Αλκυόνη)
Sterope (Στερόπη)
Celaeno (Κελαινώ)
Electra (Ηλέκτρα)
Maia (Μαία)
Merope (Μερώπη)
Taygete (Ταϋγέτη)
Sabazios (Σαβάζιος), the nomadic horseman and sky father god of the Phrygians and Thracians
Selene (Σελήνη), goddess of the Moon
Uranus (Ουρανός), primeval god of the heavens
Zeus (Ζεύς), King of Heaven and god of the sky, clouds, thunder, and lightning

Rustic deities

Aetna (Αἴτνη), goddess of the volcanic Mount Etna in Sicily
Agreus and Nomios two goat-legged daimones of hunting & hurding
Amphictyonis (Αμφικτυονίς), goddess of wine and friendship between nations, a local form of Demeter
Anthousai (Ανθούσαι), flower nymphs
Aristaeus (Ἀρισταῖος), god of bee-keeping, cheese-making, herding, olive-growing, and hunting
Attis (Άττις), vegetation god and consort of Cybele
Britomartis (Βριτόμαρτις), Cretan goddess of hunting and nets used for fishing, fowling and the hunting of small game
Meliseus, god of bees and bee-keeping in Crete.
Cabeiri (Κάβειροι), gods or spirits who presided over the Mysteries of the islands of Lemnos and Samothrace
Aitnaios (Αιτναιος)
Alkon (Αλκων)
Eurymedon (Ευρυμεδών)
Onnes (Όννης)
Tonnes (Τόννης)
Chloris (Χλωρίς), minor flower nymph and wife of Zephyrus
Comus (Κόμος), god of revelry, merrymaking, and festivity
Corymbus (Κόρυμβος), god of the fruit of the ivy
The Curetes (Κουρέτες), guardians of infant Zeus on Mount Ida, barely distinguished from the Dactyls and the Corybantes
Cybele (Κυβέλη), a Phrygian mountain goddess
The Dactyls (Δάκτυλοι) "fingers", minor deities originally representing fingers of a hand
Acmon (Ακμών)
Damnameneus (Δαμναμενεύς)
Delas (Δήλας)
Epimedes (Επιμήδης)
Heracles (not to be confused with the hero Heracles)
Iasios (Ιάσιος)
Kelmis (Κελμις)
Skythes (Σκύθης)
companions of Cybele
Titias (Τιτίας)
Cyllenus (Κύλληνος)
Dionysus (Διόνυσος), god of wine, drunken orgies, and wild vegetation
Dryades (Δρυάδες), tree and forest nymphs
Gaia (Γαία), primeval goddess of the earth
Epimeliades (Επιμελίδες), nymphs of highland pastures and protectors of sheep flocks
Hamadryades (Αμαδρυάδες), oak tree dryades
Hecaterus (Ηεκατερος), minor god of the hekateris — a rustic dance of quickly moving hands — and perhaps of the skill of hands in general
Hermes (Ερμής), god of herds and flocks, of roads and boundary stones, and the god of thieves
Korybantes (Κορύβαντες), the crested dancers who worshipped Cybele
Damneus (Δαμνεύς) "the one who tames(?)"
Idaios (Ιδαίος) "of Mount Ida"
Kyrbas (Κύρβας), whose name is probably a variant of Korybas, singular for "Korybantes"
Okythoos (Ωκύθοος) "the one running swiftly"
Prymneus (Πρυμνεύς) "of lower areas(?)"
Pyrrhichos (Πυρῥιχος), god of the rustic dance
Ma, a local goddess at Comana in Cappadocia
Maenades (μαινάδες), crazed nymphs in the retinue of Dionysus
Methe (Μέθη), nymph of drunkenness
Meliae (Μελίαι), nymphs of honey and the ash tree
Naiades (Ναιάδες), fresh water nymphs
Daphne (Δάφνη)
Metope (Μετώπη)
Minthe (Μίνθη)
The Nymphai Hyperboreioi (Νύμφαι Υπερβόρειοι), who presided over aspects of archery
Hekaerge (Εκαέργη), represented distancing
Loxo (Λοξώ), represented trajectory
Oupis (Ουπις), represented aim
Oreades (Ὀρεάδες), mountain nymphs
Adrasteia (Αδράστεια), a nursemaid of the infant Zeus
Cyllene, the mountain-nymph who nursed the infant Hermes
Echo (Ηχώ), a nymph cursed never to speak except to repeat the words of others
The Ourea (Ούρος), primeval gods of mountains
The Palici (Παλικοί), a pair of rustic gods who presided over the geysers and thermal springs in Sicily
Pan (Πάν), god of shepherds, pastures, and fertility
Pan Sybarios (Παν Συβαριος) god of Woods and vales
Phaunos god of forests not identified with Faunus
Potamoi (Ποταμοί), river gods
Achelous (Αχέλους)
Acis (Άκις)
Alpheus (Αλφειός)
Asopus (Ασωπός)
Cladeus (Κλάδεος)
Eurotas (Ευρώτας)
Nilus (Νείλος)
Peneus (Πηνειός)
Scamander (Σκάμανδρος)
 For a more complete list, see Potamoi#List of potamoi
Priapus (Πρίαπος), god of garden fertility
Satyrs (Σάτυροι) / Satyress, rustic fertility spirits
Krotos (Κρότος), a great hunter and musician who kept the company of the Muses on Mount Helicon
Silenus (Σειληνός), an old rustic god of the dance of the wine-press
Telete (Τελέτη), goddess of initiation into the Bacchic orgies
Zagreus (Ζαγρεύς), in the Orphic mysteries, the first incarnation of Dionysus

Agricultural deities

Adonis (Άδωνις), a life-death-rebirth deity
Aphaea (Αφαία), minor goddess of agriculture and fertility
Cyamites (Κυαμίτης), demi-god of the bean
Demeter (Δημήτηρ), goddess of fertility, agriculture, grain, and harvest
Despoina (Δέσποινη), daughter of Poseidon and Demeter, goddess of mysteries in Arcadia
Dionysus (Διόνυσος), god of viticulture and wine
Eunostus (Εύνοστος), goddess of the flour mill
Persephone (Περσεφόνη), queen of the underworld, wife of Hades and goddess of spring growth
Philomelus (Φιλόμελος), agricultural demi-god inventor of the wagon and the plough
Plutus (Πλοῦτος), god of wealth, including agricultural wealth, son of Demeter
Promylaia (Προμυλαια) a goddess of the flower mill
Triptolemus (Τριπτόλεμος), god of farming and agriculture, he brought agriculture to Greece
Trokhilos (Τροχιλος) god of the mill stone

Health deities

Apollo (Ἀπόλλων), god of archery, music and dance, truth and prophecy, healing and diseases, the Sun and light, poetry, and more.
Asclepius (Ασκληπιός), god of medicine
Aceso (Ἀκεσώ), goddess of the healing of wounds and the curing of illnesses
Aegle (Αἴγλη), goddess of radiant good health
Chiron (Χείρων), god of healing (up for debate if it is a god)
Darrhon (Δάρρων), Macedonian god of health
Epione (Ἠπιόνη), goddess of the soothing of pain
Hygieia (Ὑγεία), goddess of cleanliness and good health
Iaso (Ἰασώ), goddess of cures, remedies, and modes of healing
Paean (Παιάν), physician of the gods
Panacea (Πανάκεια), goddess of healing
Telesphorus (Τελεσφόρος), demi-god of convalescence, who "brought to fulfillment" recuperation from illness or injury

Sleep deities

Empusa (Ἔμπουσα), goddess of shape-shifting
Epiales (Ἐφιάλτης), goddess of nightmares
Hypnos (Ὕπνος) god of sleep
Pasithea (Πασιθέα) goddess of relaxing meditation and hallucinations
Oneiroi (Ὀνείρων) god of dreams
Morpheus (μορφή) god of dreaming

Charities
Charites (Χάριτες), goddesses of charm, beauty, nature, human creativity, and fertility
Aglaea (Αγλαΐα), goddess of beauty, adornment, splendor, and glory
Euphrosyne (Εὐφροσύνη), goddess of good cheer, joy, mirth, and merriment
Thalia (Θάλεια), goddess of festive celebrations and rich and luxurious banquets
Hegemone (Ηγεμόνη) "mastery"
Antheia (Άνθεια), goddess of flowers and flowery wreaths
Pasithea (Πασιθέα), goddess of rest and relaxation
Cleta (Κλήτα) "the glorious"
Phaenna (Φαέννα) "the shining"
Eudaimonia (Ευδαιμονία) "happiness"
Euthymia (Ευθυμία) "good mood"
Calleis (Καλλείς) "beauty"
Paidia (Παιδία) "play, amusement"
Pandaisia (Πανδαισία) "banquet for everyone"
Pannychis (Παννυχίς) "all-night (festivity)"

Horae
The Horae (Ώρες), The Hours, the goddesses of natural order
Eunomia (Ευνομία), spirit of good order, and springtime goddess of green pastures
Dike (Δίκη), spirit of justice, may have represented springtime growth
Eirene (Ειρήνη), spirit of peace and goddess of the springtime
The goddesses of springtime growth
Thallo (Θαλλώ), goddess of spring buds and shoots, identified with Eirene
Auxo (Αυξώ), goddess of spring growth
Karpo (Καρπώ), goddess of the fruits of the earth
The goddesses of welfare
Pherousa (Φέρουσα) "the bringer"
Euporie (Ευπορίη) "abundance"
Orthosie (Ορθοσίη) "prosperity"
The goddesses of the natural portions of time and the times of day
Auge (Αυγή), first light of the morning
Anatole (Ανατολή) or Anatolia (Ανατολία), sunrise
Mousika or Musica (Μουσική), the morning hour of music and study
Gymnastika, Gymnastica (Γυμναστίκή) or Gymnasia (Γυμνασία), the morning hour of gymnastics/exercise
Nymphe (Νυμφή), the morning hour of ablutions (bathing, washing)
Mesembria (Μεσημβρία), noon
Sponde (Σπονδή), libations poured after lunch
Elete, prayer, the first of the afternoon work hours
Akte, Acte (Ακτή) or Cypris (Κυπρίς), eating and pleasure, the second of the afternoon work hours
Hesperis (Έσπερίς), evening
Dysis (Δύσις), sunset
Arktos (Άρκτος), night sky, constellation
The goddesses of seasons of the year
Eiar (Είαρ), spring
Theros (Θέρος), summer
Pthinoporon (Φθινόπωρον), autumn
Cheimon (Χειμών), winter

Muses

Other deities

Mortals

Deified mortals

Achilles, hero of the Trojan War
Aiakos, a king of Aegina, appointed as a Judge of the Dead in the Underworld after his death
Aeolus, a king of Thessaly, made the immortal king of all the winds by Zeus
Alabandus, he was the founder of the town of Alabanda
Amphiaraus, a hero of the war of the Seven against Thebes who became an oracular spirit of the Underworld after his death
Ariadne (Αριάδνη), a Cretan princess who became the immortal wife of Dionysus
Aristaeus (Ἀρισταῖος), a Thessalian hero, his inventions saw him immortalised as the god of bee-keeping, cheese-making, herding, olive-growing, and hunting
Asclepius, a Thessalian physician who was struck down by Zeus for reviving the dead, to be later recovered by his father Apollo
Attis, a consort of Cybele, granted immortality as one of her attendants
Bolina, a mortal woman transformed into an immortal nymph by Apollo
The Dioscuri, divine twins
Castor
Pollux
Endymion, lover of Selene, granted eternal sleep so as never to age or die
Ganymede, a handsome Trojan prince, abducted by Zeus and made cup-bearer of the gods
Glaucus, the fisherman's sea god, made immortal after eating a magical herb
Hemithea and Parthenos, princesses of the Island of Naxos who leapt into the sea to escape their father's wrath; Apollo transformed them into demi-goddesses
Heracles, ascended hero

Ino, a Theban princess who became the sea goddess Leucothea
Lampsace, a semi-historical Bebrycian princess honored as goddess for her assistance to the Greeks
The Leucippides, wives of the Dioscuri
Phoebe, wife of Pollux
Hilaera, wife of Castor
Minos, a king of Crete, appointed as a Judge of the Dead in the Underworld after his death
Orithyia, an Athenian princess abducted by Boreas and made the goddess of cold, gusty mountain winds
Palaemon, a Theban prince, made into a sea god along with his mother, Ino
Philoctetes, was the son of King Poeas of Meliboea in Thessaly, a famous archer, fought at the Trojan War
Phylonoe, daughter of Tyndareus and Leda, made immortal by Artemis
Psyche, goddess of the soul
Semele, mortal mother of Dionysus, who later was made the goddess Thyone
Tenes, was a hero of the island of Tenedos

Heroes

Abderus, aided Heracles during his eighth labour and was killed by the Mares of Diomedes
Achilles (Αχιλλεύς or Αχιλλέας), hero of the Trojan War and a central character in Homer's Iliad
Aeneas (Αινείας), a hero of the Trojan War and progenitor of the Roman people
Ajax the Great (Αίας ο Μέγας), a hero of the Trojan War and king of Salamis
Ajax the Lesser (Αίας ο Μικρός), a hero of the Trojan War and leader of the Locrian army
Amphitryon (Αμφιτρύων), Theban general who rescued Thebes from the Teumessian fox; his wife was Alcmene, mother of Heracles
Antilochus (Ἀντίλοχος), Son of Nestor sacrificed himself to save his father in the Trojan War along with other deeds of valor
Bellerophon (Βελλεροφῶν), hero who slew the Chimera
Bouzyges, a hero credited with inventing agricultural practices such as yoking oxen to a plough
Castor, the mortal Dioscuri twin; after Castor's death, his immortal brother Pollux shared his divinity with him in order that they might remain together
Chrysippus (Χρύσιππος), a divine hero of Elis
Daedalus (Δαίδαλος), creator of the labyrinth and great inventor, until King Minos trapped him in his own creation
Diomedes (Διομήδης), a king of Argos and hero of the Trojan War
Eleusis (Ἐλευσῖνι or Ἐλευσῖνα), eponymous hero of the town of Eleusis
Eunostus, a Boeotian hero
Ganymede (Γανυμήδης), Trojan hero and lover of Zeus, who was given immortality and appointed cup-bearer to the gods
Hector (Ἕκτωρ), hero of the Trojan War and champion of the Trojan people
Icarus (Ἴκαρος), the son of the master craftsman Daedalus
Iolaus (Ἰόλαος), nephew of Heracles who aided his uncle in one of his Labors
Jason (Ἰάσων), leader of the Argonauts
Meleager (Μελέαγρος), a hero who sailed with the Argonauts and killed the Calydonian boar
Odysseus (Ὀδυσσεύς or Ὀδυσεύς), a hero and king of Ithaca whose adventures are the subject of Homer's Odyssey; he also played a key role during the Trojan War
Orpheus (Ὀρφεύς), a legendary musician and poet who attempted to retrieve his dead wife from the Underworld
Pandion (Πανδίων), the eponymous hero of the Attic tribe Pandionis, usually assumed to be one of the legendary Athenian kings Pandion I or Pandion II
Perseus (Περσεύς), son of Zeus and the founder-king of Mycenae and slayer of the Gorgon Medusa
Theseus (Θησεύς), son of Poseidon and a king of Athens and slayer of the Minotaur

Notable women

Alcestis (Άλκηστις), daughter of Pelias and wife of Admetus, who was known for her devotion to her husband
Amymone, the one daughter of Danaus who refused to murder her husband, thus escaping her sisters' punishment
Andromache (Ανδρομάχη), wife of Hector
Andromeda (Ανδρομέδα), wife of Perseus, who was placed among the constellations after her death
Antigone (Αντιγόνη), daughter of Oedipus and Jocasta
Arachne (Αράχνη), a skilled weaver, transformed by Athena into a spider for her blasphemy
Ariadne (Αριάδνη), daughter of Minos, king of Crete, who aided Theseus in overcoming the Minotaur and became the wife of Dionysus
Atalanta (Αταλάντη), fleet-footed heroine who participated in the Calydonian boar hunt and the quest for the Golden Fleece
Briseis, a princess of Lyrnessus, taken by Achilles as a war prize
Caeneus, formerly Caenis, a woman who was transformed into a man and became a mighty warrior
Cassandra, a princess of Troy cursed to see the future but never to be believed
Cassiopeia (Κασσιόπεια), queen of Æthiopia and mother of Andromeda
Clytemnestra, sister of Helen and unfaithful wife of Agamemnon
Danaë, the mother of Perseus by Zeus
Deianeira, the third wife and unwitting killer of Heracles
Electra, daughter of Agamemnon and Clytemnestra, she aided her brother Orestes in plotting revenge against their mother for the murder of their father
Europa, a Phoenician woman, abducted by Zeus
Hecuba (Ἑκάβη), wife of Priam, king of Troy, and mother of nineteen of his children
Helen, daughter of Zeus and Leda, whose abduction brought about the Trojan War
Hermione (Ἑρμιόνη), daughter of Menelaus and Helen; wife of Neoptolemus, and later Orestes
Iphigenia, daughter of Agamemnon and Clytemnestra; Agamemnon sacrificed her to Artemis in order to appease the goddess
Ismene, sister of Antigone
Jocasta, mother and wife of Oedipus
Medea, a sorceress and wife of Jason, who killed her own children to punish Jason for his infidelity
Medusa, a mortal woman transformed into a hideous gorgon by Athena
Niobe, a daughter of Tantalus who declared herself to be superior to Leto, causing Artemis and Apollo to kill her fourteen children
Pandora, the first woman
Penelope, loyal wife of Odysseus
Phaedra, daughter of Minos and wife of Theseus
Polyxena, the youngest daughter of Priam, sacrificed to the ghost of Achilles
Semele, mortal mother of Dionysus
Thrace, the daughter of Oceanus and Parthenope, and sister of Europa

Kings

Abas, a king of Argos
Acastus, a king of Iolcus who sailed with the Argonauts and participated in the Calydonian boar hunt
Acrisius, a king of Argos
Actaeus, first king of Attica
Admetus (Άδμητος), a king of Pherae who sailed with the Argonauts and participated in the Calydonian boar hunt
Adrastus (Άδραστος), a king of Argos and one of the Seven against Thebes
Aeacus (Αιακός), a king of the island of Aegina in the Saronic Gulf; after he died, he became one of the three judges of the dead in the Underworld
Aeëtes, a king of Colchis and father of Medea
Aegeus (Αιγεύς), a king of Athens and father of Theseus
Aegimius, a king of Thessaly and progenitor of the Dorians
Aegisthus (Αίγισθος), lover of Clytemnestra, with whom he plotted to murder Agamemnon and seized the kingship of Mycenae
Aegyptus (Αίγυπτος), a king of Egypt
Aeson, father of Jason and rightful king of Iolcus, whose throne was usurped by his half-brother Pelias
Aëthlius, first king of Elis
Aetolus (Αιτωλός), a king of Elis
Agamemnon (Ἀγαμέμνων), a king of Mycenae and commander of the Greek armies during the Trojan War
Agasthenes, a king of Elis
Agenor (Αγήνωρ), a king of Phoenicia
Alcinous (Αλκίνους or Ἀλκίνοος), a king of Phaeacia
Alcmaeon, a king of Argos and one of the Epigoni
Aleus, a king of Tegea
Amphiaraus (Ἀμφιάραος), a seer and king of Argos who participated in the Calydonian boar hunt and the war of the Seven against Thebes
Amphictyon (Ἀμφικτύων), a king of Athens
Amphion and Zethus, twin sons of Zeus and kings of Thebes, who constructed the city's walls
Amycus, son of Poseidon and king of the Bebryces
Anaxagoras (Ἀναξαγόρας), a king of Argos
Anchises (Αγχίσης), a king of Dardania and father of Aeneas
Arcesius, a king of Ithaca and father of Laertes
Argeus, a king of Argos
Argus, a son of Zeus and king of Argos after Phoroneus
Assaracus, a king of Dardania
Asterion, a king of Crete
Athamas (Ἀθάμας), a king of Orchomenus
Atreus (Ἀτρεύς), a king of Mycenae and father of Agamemnon and Menelaus
Augeas (Αυγείας), a king of Elis
Autesion, a king of Thebes
Bias, a king of Argos
Busiris, a king of Egypt
Cadmus, founder-king of Thebes
Car, a king of Megara
Catreus, a king of Crete, prophesied to die at the hands of his own son
Cecrops, an autochthonous king of Athens
Ceisus, a king of Argos
Celeus, a king of Eleusis
Cephalus, a king of Phocis who accidentally killed his own wife
Cepheus, a king of Ethiopia
Cepheus, a king of Tegea and an Argonaut
Charnabon, a king of the Getae
Cinyras, a king of Cyprus and father of Adonis
Codrus, a king of Athens
Corinthus, founder-king of Corinth
Cranaus, a king of Athens
Creon, a king of Thebes, brother of Jocasta and uncle of Oedipus
Creon, a king of Corinth who was hospitable towards Jason and Medea
Cres, an early Cretan king
Cresphontes, a king of Messene and descendant of Heracles
Cretheus, founder-king of Iolcus
Criasus, a king of Argos
Cylarabes, a king of Argos
Cynortas, a king of Sparta
Cyzicus, king of the Dolionians, mistakenly killed by the Argonauts
Danaus, a king of Egypt and father of the Danaides
Dardanus, founder-king of Dardania, and son of Zeus and Electra
Deiphontes, a king of Argos
Demophon of Athens, a king of Athens
Diomedes, a king of Argos and hero of the Trojan War
Echemus, a king of Arcadia
Echetus, a king of Epirus
Eetion, a king of Cilician Thebe and father of Andromache
Electryon, a king of Tiryns and Mycenae; son of Perseus and Andromeda
Elephenor, a king of the Abantes of Euboea
Eleusis, eponym and king of Eleusis, Attica
Epaphus, a king of Egypt and founder of Memphis, Egypt
Epopeus, a king of Sicyon
Erechtheus, a king of Athens
Erginus, a king of Minyean Orchomenus in Boeotia
Erichthonius, a king of Athens, born of Hephaestus' attempt to rape Athena
Eteocles, a king of Thebes and son of Oedipus; he and his brother Polynices killed each other
Eteocles, son of Andreus, a king of Orchomenus
Eurotas, a king of Sparta
Eurystheus, a king of Tiryns
Euxantius, a king of Ceos, son of Minos and Dexithea
Gelanor, a king of Argos
Haemus, a king of Thrace
Helenus, seer and twin brother of Cassandra, who later became king of Epirus
Hippothoön, a king of Eleusis
Hyrieus, a king of Boeotia
Ilus, founder-king of Troy
Ixion, a king of the Lapiths who attempted to rape Hera and was bound to a flaming wheel in Tartarus
Laërtes, father of Odysseus and king of the Cephallenians; he sailed with the Argonauts and participated in the Calydonian boar hunt
Laomedon, a king of Troy and father of Priam
Lycaon of Arcadia, a deceitful Arcadian king who was transformed by Zeus into a wolf
Lycurgus of Arcadia, a king of Arcadia
Lycurgus, a king of Nemea, and/or a priest of Zeus at Nemea
Makedon, a king of Macedon
Megareus of Onchestus, a king of Onchestus in Boeotia
Megareus of Thebes, a king of Thebes
Melampus, a legendary soothsayer and healer, and king of Argos
Melanthus, a king of Messenia
Memnon, a king of Ethiopia who fought on the side of Troy during the Trojan War
Menelaus, a king of Sparta and the husband of Helen
Menestheus, a king of Athens who fought on the side of the Greeks during the Trojan War
Midas, a king of Phrygia granted the power to turn anything to gold with a touch
Minos, a king of Crete; after his death, became one of the judges of the dead in the Underworld
Myles, a king of Laconia
Nestor, a king of Pylos who sailed with the Argonauts, participated in the Calydonian boar hunt and fought with the Greek armies in the Trojan War
Nycteus, a king of Thebes
Odysseus, a hero and king of Ithaca whose adventures are the subject of Homer's Odyssey; he also played a key role during the Trojan War
Oebalus, a king of Sparta
Oedipus, a king of Thebes fated to kill his father and marry his mother
Oeneus, a king of Calydon
Oenomaus, a king of Pisa
Oenopion, a king of Chios
Ogygus, a king of Thebes
Oicles, a king of Argos
Oileus, a king of Locris
Orestes, a king of Argos and a son of Clytemnestra and Agamemnon; he killed his mother in revenge for her murder of his father
Oxyntes, a king of Athens
Pandion I, a king of Athens
Pandion II, a king of Athens
Peleus, king of the Myrmidons and father of Achilles; he sailed with the Argonauts and participated in the Calydonian boar hunt
Pelias, a king of Iolcus and usurper of Aeson's rightful throne
Pelops, a king of Pisa and founder of the House of Atreus
Pentheus, a king of Thebes who banned the worship of Dionysus and was torn apart by Maenads
Periphas, legendary king of Attica who Zeus turned into an eagle
Perseus (Περσεύς), founder-king of Mycenae and slayer of the Gorgon Medusa
Phineus, a king of Thrace
Phlegyas, a king of the Lapiths
Phoenix, son of Agenor, founder-king of Phoenicia
Phoroneus, a king of Argos
Phyleus, a king of Elis
Pirithoös, king of the Lapiths and husband of Hippodamia, at whose wedding the Battle of Lapiths and Centaurs occurred
Pittheus, a king of Troezen and grandfather of Theseus
Polybus of Corinth, a king of Corinth
Polybus of Sicyon, a king of Sicyon and son of Hermes
Polybus of Thebes, a king of Thebes
Polynices, a king of Thebes and son of Oedipus; he and his brother Eteocles killed each other
Priam, king of Troy during the Trojan War
Proetus, a king of Argos and Tiryns
Pylades, a king of Phocis and friend of Orestes
Rhadamanthys, a king of Crete; after his death, he became a judge of the dead in the Underworld
Rhesus, a king of Thrace who sided with Troy in the Trojan War
Sarpedon, a king of Lycia and son of Zeus who fought on the side of the Greeks during the Trojan War
Sisyphus, a king of Thessaly who attempted to cheat death and was sentenced to an eternity of rolling a boulder up a hill, only to watch it roll back down
Sithon, a king of Thrace
Talaus, a king of Argos who sailed with the Argonauts
Tegyrios, a king of Thrace
Telamon, a king of Salamis and father of Ajax; he sailed with the Argonauts and participated in the Calydonian boar hunt
Telephus, a king of Mysia and son of Heracles
Temenus, a king of Argos and descendant of Heracles
Teucer, founder-king of Salamis who fought alongside the Greeks in the Trojan War
Teutamides, a king of Larissa
Teuthras, a king of Mysia
Thersander, a king of Thebes and one of the Epigoni
Theseus, a king of Athens and slayer of the Minotaur
Thyestes, a king of Mycenae and brother of Atreus
Tisamenus, a king of Argos, Mycenae, and Sparta
Tyndareus, a king of Sparta

Seers/oracles

Amphilochus (Ἀμφίλοχος), a seer and brother of Alcmaeon who died in the war of the Seven against Thebes
Anius, son of Apollo who prophesied that the Trojan War would be won in its tenth year
Asbolus, a seer Centaur
Bakis
Branchus, a seer and son of Apollo
Calchas, an Argive seer who aided the Greeks during the Trojan War
Carnus, an Acarnanian seer and lover of Apollo
Carya, a seer and lover of Dionysus
Cassandra, a princess of Troy cursed to see the future but never to be believed
Ennomus, a Mysian seer, killed by Achilles during the Trojan War
Halitherses, an Ithacan seer who warned Penelope's suitors of Odysseus' return
Helenus, seer and twin brother of Cassandra, who later became king of Epirus
Iamus, a son of Apollo possessing the gift of prophecy, he founded the Iamidai
Idmon, a seer who sailed with the Argonauts
Manto, seer and daughter of Tiresias
Melampus, a legendary soothsayer and healer, and king of Argos
Mopsus, the name of two legendary seers
Polyeidos, a Corinthian seer who saved the life of Glaucus
Pythia, the oracle of Delphi
Telemus, a seer who foresaw that the Cyclops Polyphemus would be blinded by Odysseus
Theoclymenus, an Argive seer
Tiresias, blind prophet of Thebes

Amazons

Inmates of Tartarus
The Danaides, forty-nine daughters of Danaus who murdered their husbands and were condemned to an eternity of carrying water in leaky jugs
Ixion, a king of the Lapiths who attempted to rape Hera and was bound to a flaming wheel in Tartarus
Sisyphus, a king of Thessaly who attempted to cheat death and was sentenced to an eternity of rolling a boulder up a hill, only to watch it roll back down
Tantalus, a king of Anatolia who butchered his son Pelops and served him as a meal to the gods; he was punished with the torment of starvation, food and drink eternally dangling just out of reach

Minor figures

See also

Classical mythology
Family tree of the Greek gods
List of Trojan War characters
Lists of deities
List of Roman deities
List of Mycenaean deities
Lists of legendary creatures
List of Greek mythological creatures

References

External links

 
Lists of deities
Greek mythology-related lists